The 1984 Segunda División de Chile was the 33rd season of the Segunda División de Chile.

Unión La Calera was the tournament's champion.

Final table

North Zone

South Zone

Promotion playoffs

See also
Chilean football league system

References

External links
 RSSSF - List of Second Division Champions

Segunda División de Chile (1952–1995) seasons
Primera B
1984 in South American football leagues